Graditz is a village and a former municipality of 250 inhabitants in the Nordsachsen landkreis of Saxony. Formerly an independent municipality, it was absorbed by Torgau in 1994.

References

Former municipalities in Saxony
Torgau